Paulo Henrique Souza de Oliveira (born 5 January 1943), usually called Paulo Henrique, is a Brazilian former professional football player and the manager of Macaé Esporte. He played as defender, and represented the Brazil national team at the 1966 FIFA World Cup.

His son Paulo Henrique Filho and his grandson Henrique Lordelo also played professionally.

Honours

Players 
 Flamengo
 Torneio Rio-São Paulo: 1961
 Campeonato Carioca: 1963, 1965, 1972 
 Torneio do Povo: 1972
Avaí
 Campeonato Catarinense: 1973

Manager 
Goytacaz
 Campeonato Carioca Série B1: 2017

References

External links

1943 births
Living people
Association football defenders
Brazilian footballers
Brazilian football managers
Brazil international footballers
1966 FIFA World Cup players
CR Flamengo footballers
Avaí FC players
Botafogo de Futebol e Regatas players
Esporte Clube Bahia players
Bonsucesso Futebol Clube players
Goytacaz Futebol Clube managers
People from Macaé
Sportspeople from Rio de Janeiro (state)
Macaé Esporte Futebol Clube managers